John de Gisburn was a Member of Parliament for the constituency of York. During his career he also held the office of Lord Mayor of York.

Life and politics

He was born in 1336 in the city of York. He married Ellen and they had two children, Alice and Isabel. He was Lord Mayor of York in 1371, 1372 and 1380.

John de Gisburn, also known as John Gisburn, was involved in factional disputes with other prominent merchants in the city of York during the 1380's. This led to him being chased out of his mayoral duties in 1380 by Simon Quixley. The Westminster government had to step him and restore his position.

He died in York in 1390. He was survived by his wife who died around 1407/08. His daughter, Alice, married Sir William Plumpton, Constable of Knaresborough Castle, in 1382.

References

1336 births
1390 deaths
Politicians from York
Lord Mayors of York
English MPs 1360